Loris Rouiller (born 21 February 2000) is a Swiss cyclist, who currently rides for UCI Continental team . He primarily competes in cyclo-cross, but also on the road and in mountain biking.

Major results

Cyclo-cross

2016–2017
 1st  National Junior Championships
 2nd Steinmaur
 Junior Soudal Classics
3rd Leuven
2017–2018
 1st  UEC European Junior Championships
 1st  National Junior Championships
 Junior DVV Trophy
1st Baal
1st Hamme
1st Ronse
2nd Loenhout
 UCI Junior World Cup
1st Namur
 Junior Superprestige
1st Gieten
 Junior Brico Cross
1st Meulebeke
2nd Hulst
2018–2019
 1st  National Under-23 Championships
 Under-23 Brico Cross
1st Hulst
 Under-23 DVV Trophy
3rd Loenhout
3rd Baal
2019–2020
 1st Munich
 1st Steinmaur
 Under-23 DVV Trophy
1st Loenhout
 2nd National Under-23 Championships
 UCI Under-23 World Cup
3rd Heusden-Zolder
3rd Bern
2020–2021
 2nd National Under-23 Championships
 2nd Steinmaur
2021–2022
 Coupe de France
1st Troyes
1st Pierric
2nd Quelneuc
 Under-23 Coupe de France
1st Troyes
1st Pierric
1st Quelneuc
 1st Hittnau
 1st Brumath
 2nd National Under-23 Championships
 2nd Destil
2022–2023
 1st Overall Swiss Cup
1st Bulle
3rd Hittnau
 1st Dijon
 Coupe de France
2nd Troyes II
3rd Camors I
3rd Nommay II
 3rd Brumath

Road
2017
 4th Road race, National Junior Championships

References

External links

2000 births
Living people
Swiss male cyclists
Cyclo-cross cyclists